A wine critic is a person who evaluates wine and describes it either with a numerical rating, a tasting note, or a combination of both. Their critiques, found in books, newspapers, magazines, newsletters, online, or in sales materials for wine, are often used by consumers in the process of deciding whether or not to buy a wine.

Journalistic criticism
Critics working for wine-related magazines generally review new releases, often in comparison with other wines from the same region, grape variety, or vintage. Occasionally, retrospective tastings will be published as well, tasting wines years or decades after their initial review was published.

Methodology
The tasting methodology of different outlets varies; for example, the American publication, Wine Spectator, has editors taste wines blind in flights of similar vintage and variety. Other outlets taste in similar fashion. Different critics will use different descriptive scales, with the major US critics using a 50–100 point scale, and most newspapers using a 5-star scale.

Notable critics
 James Laube, editor at Wine Spectator
 Antonio Galloni, former reviewer at Wine Advocate; founder of Vinous
 Allen Meadows, publisher of Burghound
 Robert M. Parker, publisher of the Wine Advocate
 Lisa Perrotti-Brown, editor in chief of the Wine Advocate; Master of Wine
 Jancis Robinson, British Master of Wine; Financial Times writer
 Stephen Tanzer, editor at Vinous
 Gary Vaynerchuk, director of Wine Library, former Internet critic

References